Ognjen Todorović (born 24 March 1989) is a Bosnian professional footballer who plays as a left midfielder for Bosnian Premier League club Leotar.

He also played for the Bosnia and Herzegovina national team in 2018.

International career
Todorović made his debut for Bosnia and Herzegovina on 28 January 2018 in a friendly match against the USA.

Honours
Sarajevo  
Bosnian Cup: 2013–14

Zrinjski Mostar  
Bosnian Premier League: 2015–16, 2016–17, 2017–18

References

External links

Ognjen Todorović at Sofascore

1989 births
Living people
Sportspeople from Zenica
Association football midfielders
Bosnia and Herzegovina footballers
Bosnia and Herzegovina international footballers
FK Slavija Sarajevo players
Maccabi Petah Tikva F.C. players
FK Sarajevo players
HŠK Zrinjski Mostar players
FK Leotar players
Ankaraspor footballers
Premier League of Bosnia and Herzegovina players
Liga Leumit players
TFF First League players
Bosnia and Herzegovina expatriate footballers
Expatriate footballers in Israel
Bosnia and Herzegovina expatriate sportspeople in Israel
Expatriate footballers in Turkey
Bosnia and Herzegovina expatriate sportspeople in Turkey